Piparahi  is one of the habitation/locality (Tola) of Amwa Khas village (gram panchayat) in Kushinagar district of Uttar Pradesh. It comes under Dudahi block of Tamkuhi Raj tehsil in the district. Gobaraha in north,  Dasahwaha in south, Ultahawa in west and Lilahat in east are nearby habitation. This Tola is about 5 kilometers away from The Gandaki River in east. It is about 3 kilometers near U.P-Bihar border in north. The village is 10 kilometers away from Dudahi railway station (Broad gauge), 35 kilometers away from Tamkuhi Raj tehsil on Grand Trunk highway and 38 kilometers from Padrauna – district secretariat. It is highly populated habitation. Piparahi has one government primary school and one private primary school- Shri Mahatma Gandhi Gyan Mandir. This locality has two temples and a market, Piparahi Bazar.) People of Hindu and Muslim community resides here peacefully. Most of the population of the habitation is from backward class. It is covered under Pradhan mantri gram sadak yojna and Rajive Gandhi vidyut vikash yojna. Land of the villagers are highly fertile for sugarcane, wheat, rice and other seasonal crops.

References

External links 
 Piparahi on Wikimapia

Villages in Kushinagar district